Amina Mahmoud Warsame is a Somali social scientist who served as executive director of Nagaad, a women's group in Hargeisa Somaliland. Co-author of Social and Cultural Aspects of Female Circumcision and Infibulation: A Preliminary Report (1985), she was one of the early voices raised in Africa against female genital mutilation, along with Raqiya Abdalla, Asma El Dareer, Efua Dorkenoo, and Nahid Toubia.

Warsame lived in Sweden after fleeing Somalia to escape the Somali Civil War. She helped found the Somaliland Women's Research and Action Group (SOWRAG), and in 2005 she stood for a seat in Somaliland's parliament, one of the first women to do so.

Education
Warsame was awarded a master's degree in human development by the Institute of Social Studies in The Hague.

Selected works

References

Activists against female genital mutilation
Living people
Somalian feminists
Somalian scholars
Year of birth missing (living people)